Miss Iceland is a 2018 novel by award-winning novelist Auður Ava Ólafsdóttir.

Set in the conservative Icelandic society of the 1960s, this novel showcases Hekla, a woman eager to become a writer and free herself from social prejudice.

References 

2018 novels
Icelandic novels
Novels set in Iceland
Novels set in the 1960s
Grove Press books